"Broken & Beautiful" is a song by American singer Kelly Clarkson for the soundtrack to the 2019 animation film UglyDolls. It was produced by American DJ Marshmello with British producer Steve Mac, both of whom had co-written the song with American singer Pink and Irish musician Johnny McDaid. The song was released by Atlantic Records as the soundtrack's lead single on March 27, 2019.

Description
"Broken & Beautiful" is an uplifting electropop anthem written by Pink, Johnny McDaid, Marshmello, and Steve Mac, and produced by the latter two. It was released by Atlantic Records as the lead single to the soundtrack to the 2019 animated musical comedy film UglyDolls, to which Clarkson plays a lead role. In the song, the singer is searching for someone to love her as she is. Beginning with a four-chord synth pulse, the track utilizes a quiet-loud dynamic, with Clarkson belting in a high register on the chorus.

Commercial performance
"Broken & Beautiful" debuted on the Billboard Kid Digital Song Sales chart on the week ending April 6, 2019, at number 4 and rose to the top of the chart the following week. That same week, it also entered the Billboard Digital Song Sales chart at number 25 with 9,000 digital song sales,. the Billboard Canadian Digital Song Sales chart at number 30, the Official New Zealand Hot Singles Chart at number 35, and on the Australian ARIA Digital Track Chart at number 48.

Music video
The music video for the single was released on April 25, 2019, and was directed by Jay Martin.

Live performances
From March 29–30, 2019, Clarkson premiered "Broken & Beautiful" live on the last two shows of her Meaning of Life Tour in Nashville, Tennessee and Greenville, South Carolina, respectively. At the conclusion of the STX Films' presentation at CinemaCon in Las Vegas, she performed a rendition of the song. She has also performed it in live television: premiering on the Tonight Show Starring Jimmy Fallon on April 3, 2019, and later on The Today Show the following morning. On April 30, 2019, she performed it on The Voice, and the 2019 Billboard Music Awards on May 1, 2019.

Track listing
Digital streaming

Charts

Weekly charts

Year-end charts

Certifications

Release history

References 

2019 singles
2019 songs
Atlantic Records singles
Kelly Clarkson songs
Song recordings produced by Steve Mac
Songs written for animated films
Songs written by Pink (singer)
Songs written by Johnny McDaid
Songs written by Marshmello
Songs written by Steve Mac
Songs written for films